Paula Joy Green  (born 1955) is a New Zealand poet and children's author.

Background 
Green was born in 1955, in Auckland. She attended the Kamo High School.

In 2005 Green received her PhD in Italian, supervised by Bernadette Luciano, and was Literary Fellow at the University of Auckland.

Green is married to the painter Michael Hight and currently lives in Auckland.

Career 
Green has published several collections of her own poetry including:
 Cookhouse (1997, Auckland University Press)
 Chrome (2000, Auckland University Press)
 Crosswind (2004, Auckland University Press)
 Making Lists for Francis Hodgkins (2007, Auckland University Press)
 Slip Stream (2010, Auckland University Press)
 The Baker's Thumbprint (2013, Seraph Press)
 New York Pocket Book (2017, Seraph Press)
  "The Track" (2019, Seraph Press)

Her books for children include:
 Flamingo Bendalingo: Poems from the Zoo (2006, Auckland University Press), as editor, written in collaboration with fifty children, illustrated by Michael Hight 
 The Terrible Night (2008, Random House), illustrated by Chris Grosz
 Macaroni Moon (2008, Random House), illustrated by Sarah Laing
 Aunt Concertina and Her Niece Evalina (2009, Random House), illustrated by Michael Hight 
 The Letterbox Cat and Other Poems (2014, Scholastic), illustrated by Myles Lawford
 Treasury of NZ Poems for Children (2014, Random House), as editor, illustrated by Jenny Cooper
   'Groovy Fish and other poems (2019, The Cuba Press)

Poems by Green have been published in the Best New Zealand Poems series, including the 2002, 2004, and 2006 editions. She was guest editor for the publication in 2007. Green has also been selected as a featured poet in the journal, Poetry New Zealand, and appeared in the British literary journal Fire.

In 2010, with Harry Ricketts, she co-authored 99 Ways into New Zealand Poetry. She has also edited an anthology of love poems entitled Dear Heart: 150 New Zealand Love Poems.

In 2019 Green published Wild Honey: Reading NZ Women's Poetry (Massey University Press) which was shortlisted for the Ockham NZ Book Awards in 2020.

Green has been a judge for several literary awards including the New Zealand Post Book Awards, 2008 New Zealand Post Secondary School Poetry Competition, and 2014 Sarah Broom Poetry Prize.

Green maintains two blogs with a focus on poetry, one targeting adults, NZ Poetry Shelf, and the other aimed at children, NZ Poetry Box.

Awards 
Green won the poetry prize in the 2017 Prime Minister's Awards for Literary Achievement.

In the 2017 New Year Honours, Green was appointed a Member of the New Zealand Order of Merit for services as a poet and to literature.

Book awards 
99 Ways into New Zealand Poetry was a finalist in the General Non-Fiction category of the 2011 New Zealand Post Book Awards.

The Storylines Children's Literature Charitable Trust of New Zealand has recognised several of her children's books, three receiving the Notable Non-Fiction Book title (Flamingo Bendalingo: Poems from the Zoo in 2007, Treasury of NZ Poems for Children in 2015, and The Letterbox Cat & Other Poems, also in 2015) and Aunt Concertina and her Niece Evalina in 2010 as a Notable Picture Book.

The Letterbox Cat and Other Poems was shortlisted for the 2015 LIANZA Children's Book Awards and won the Children's Choice Non-Fiction Award at the 2015 New Zealand Post Book Awards for Children and Young Adults.

References

External links 
 NZ Poetry Shelf, Green's poetry blog for adults
 Poetry Box, Green's poetry blog for children

Further reading 
 Paula Green resources in the New Zealand Electronic Poetry centre (including links to works and audio files)

1955 births
Living people
Writers from Auckland
New Zealand women poets
20th-century New Zealand poets
21st-century New Zealand poets
Norwegian women children's writers
University of Auckland alumni
Members of the New Zealand Order of Merit
20th-century New Zealand women writers
21st-century New Zealand women writers
People educated at Kamo High School
20th-century Norwegian women